Angel G. Luévano, et al., Plaintiffs v. Alan Campbell, Director, Office of Personnel Management, et al. also known as Luévano v. Campbell, [93 F.R.D. 68 (D.D.C. 1981)] Luévano v. Campbell began when Angel G. Luévano, and a group of civil rights lawyers, acting on behalf of those blacks and Hispanics who had failed the test (Luévano being one of them) filed a lawsuit alleging that the Professional and Administrative Careers Examination (PACE) written test used by Civil Service Commission had an adverse impact on African Americans and Hispanics.

Background
The class-action suit was filed against Alan Campbell, the director of the Office of Personnel Management (or Civil Service Commission, as it was then called). Though Campbell was the named defendant in the case, approximately 45 other federal departments and agencies, all agencies that had ever used the PACE, were listed as representatives of the defendant class.

PACE was the principal entry-level test administered to candidates for positions in the federal government's executive branch. The suit asked the judge to declare that OPM, by using the test, had deprived the plaintiffs of rights secured by Title VII of the Civil Rights Act of 1964.

Luévano consent decree

The Luévano consent decree is the 1981 agreement that settled the lawsuit and called for the elimination of PACE and required replacing it with alternative examinations. It has been criticized by constitutional scholar Walter Berns as creating a system of backdoor racial quotas for hiring in the federal government. In response to the consent decree, OPM developed the Administrative Careers with America examination, which is used in some cases. The consent decree also established two special hiring programs, Outstanding Scholar and Bilingual/Bicultural, for limited use in filling former PACE positions.

See also
List of class-action lawsuits

References

External links

United States equal protection case law
United States affirmative action case law
United States District Court for the District of Columbia cases
1981 in United States case law
Class action lawsuits
United States Office of Personnel Management